The 2010–11 season was the 98th full season in the history of Cambridge United. They competed in the Conference National, finishing 17th of 24, along with various cup competitions.

After relegation from the Football League in 2005, where the club had enjoyed a 35-year stay, the club were hopeful of ending their six-year spell in non-league football following a season of consolidation under manager Martin Ling, who had taken over a club that had reached two successive play-off finals, but had lost both and was in disarray off the pitch.

However, United's season never recovered from a winless 5-game opening, and after flirting with relegation for much of the season, Ling was sacked on 1 February 2011 following a further run of four straight defeats, culminating in a 4–0 thrashing at the hands of Bath City. Jez George, manager of United's youth development team CRC, was appointed caretaker manager and oversaw the team's successful avoidance of relegation to the Conference South.

Background

Cambridge United were founded in 1912 as Abbey United, named after the Abbey district of Cambridge. For many years they played amateur football until their election to the Football League in 1970. The early 1990s was Cambridge's most successful period; managed by John Beck the club won the first ever play-off final at Wembley Stadium and gained promotion from the Fourth Division before reaching two successive FA Cup quarter finals in 1990 and 1991 and winning the Third Division in 1991. The club reached the play-offs in 1992 but failed in their bid to become founder members of the Premier League. This was the club's highest final league placing to date and since then it has been in almost constant decline.

The following season the club sacked Beck and were relegated from the First Division. Further relegation followed two seasons later. United returned to Division Two but were relegated in 2002. In 2005, after 35 years in the Football League, Cambridge United were relegated into the Football Conference. This brought with it financial difficulties and the club filed for administration, coming out of it three months later after the intervention of sports minister Richard Caborn, but not before selling their Abbey Stadium home to keep the club afloat and closing the youth system.

The club's first season in the Conference National was one of stabilisation, followed by a close shave with relegation. Under the stewardship of Jimmy Quinn and Gary Brabin Cambridge made two successive play-off finals but lost both to Exeter and Torquay respectively. After a season of mid-table rebuilding under new manager Martin Ling, the club were hopeful of a push for promotion at the start of the season.

Review

July
Manager Martin Ling released a number of the 2009–10 at the end of that season, including established players such as Danny Potter and Courtney Pitt,  and began to rebuild the squad in time for the upcoming season with the signings of a number of players. The signings of former Histon players Danny Wright and Danny Naisbitt, along with that of Kettering defender James Jennings and York winger Simon Russell, were announced at a game to celebrate the achievements of Director of Football Jez George in raising money and awareness for the club's 'Walk for Change' in May 2010.

This flurry of signings was followed the following month with the signing of another winger in the shape of Forest Green's Conal Platt, and experienced midfielder Adam Miller, who reportedly turned down interest from League One sides Sheffield Wednesday and Bradford City to join the club. The signing of veteran striker Daryl Clare on 1 July, arriving for a fee of £10,000 on a two-year contract, led Ling to claim that his squad was all-but complete.

August

Despite general optimism at the start of the season the team started badly, with no win coming until the 6th game, at home to Eastbourne Borough. Before the victory over Eastbourne, Cambridge found themselves in 23rd place, with just 3 points from a possible 15 and only 3 goals scored, the least in the league. The away loss to Mansfield Town was particularly difficult to stomach, as the winning goal game from a hotly disputed penalty. James Jennings was sent-off for the alleged handball, which to vindicate Cambridge's complaints, was rescinded on appeal.

September

September started much more positively, with a 5–0 thrashing of Gateshead at the Abbey Stadium. The game was also notable for summer signing Daryl Clare's first goal for the club, and former Histon striker Danny Wright's first at home. Following back-to-back home wins, the club moved into a mid-table position, however this brief run of good form was not to continue: only one more win was achieved, in between losses to Luton, Newport County and AFC Wimbledon. The club's fortunes were not helped by a hip injury to winger Conal Platt, and serious ankle damage to midfielder Adam Miller. Miller's injury turned out to be particularly serious – reconstructive surgery was forecast to put him out for 6 months.

October

The month started with two more losses, to Bath City and Hayes & Yeading, leaving the club in the relegation zone. This brought the run to four consecutive losses and forced the board to issue a vote of confidence in manager Martin Ling's management. This led to something of a renaissance in form – the club went unbeaten in the month's remaining four games, and won the last three, including a 3–0 home win against Lewes in the FA Cup Fourth Qualifying Round. Daryl Clare, who had struggled to find his old form since joining the club with just 1 goal in 13 appearances, was ruled out for 6 weeks at the end of the month with a finger injury.

November

United's injury woes continued at the start of November, with commanding centre-back Brian Saah rule out for 6 weeks after undergoing a hernia operation. This ruled Saah out of the televised FA Cup First Round tie at home to Huddersfield Town, which ended goalless, earning the club a lucrative replay. In the replay at the Galpharm Stadium, although leading through a Rory McAuley goal, Huddersfield scored twice in added time to knock the U's out.

In the league, Cambridge went unbeaten through November, picking up 6 points from their 4 goals. This included a memorable comeback against Tamworth, who were 3 goals up after 58 minutes. However, the U's rallied and goals from Robbie Willmott, Jordan Patrick (his first  for the first team) and Adam Marriott saw them salvage a point. Speaking to BBC Radio Cambridgeshire, Rory McAuley, who had enjoyed an increased role in the first team, said he thought the club had come through their difficulties, and were working more as a team, saying "we're willing to work for each other and to help each other."

Team kit
The team kit for the season is produced by Italian manufacturers Erreà, who took over from Vandanel who produced the club's kit for the previous three seasons.

The home kit changed from the previous season's amber shirt with a black sash, to a plain amber shirt following a premature end to Vandanel's sponsorship of the club owing to financial difficulties. The amber shorts and socks are also replaced, with all-black to be worn instead. The club's association with national brewers Greene King continues, with their IPA brand entering the second of a three-year deal to be worn on the front of shirts.

Following the success of previous seasons' votes, the club's away kit was the subject of a fans' vote. Three options were given, with fans invited to text a premium rate number with their favourite option. The winning design was a light blue and black striped shirt, which received 47% of the vote, narrowly beating a light and navy design with a curve detail which received 41%. The design is intended to remain for two seasons, and new manufacturers Erreà have confirmed they will go ahead with the fans' choice of design rather than adapting it to one of their standard designs. The kit will bear the name of sponsors Kershaw for the tenth season, a local record for shirt sponsorship, breaking the company's own record from the preceding sponsorship agreement.

Team

First team squad
This shows the most up-to-date Cambridge United squad following transfers during the season. To view previous players see the appearances and discipline table which includes all players to appear in a match day squad during the season.

Appearances and discipline

Last updated: 24 August 2010
Source: Cambridge United F.C. Club Statistics

Top scorers
Includes all competitive matches. The list is sorted by squad number when total goals are equal.

Last updated: 4 September 2010
Source: BBC Sport

Overall
This table takes account of all competitive matches.

{|class="wikitable"
|-
| ||align=center|Statistic ||align=center|Notes
|-
|Games played ||align=center|52 ||46 in the League, 3 in the FA Cup, 3 in the FA Trophy
|-
|Games won ||align=center|13 ||11 in the League, 1 in the FA Cup, 1 in the FA Trophy
|-
|Games drawn ||align=center|19 ||17 in the League, 1 in the FA Cup, 1 in the FA Trophy
|-
|Games lost ||align=center|20 ||18 in the League, 1 in the FA Cup, 1 in the FA Trophy
|-
|Goals scored ||align=center|65 ||See Top Scorers table above for distribution
|-
|Goals conceded ||align=center|73 || 
|-
|Goal difference ||align=center|8 ||
|-
|Clean sheets ||align=center|14 ||
|-
|Yellow cards ||align=center|73 ||
|-
|Red cards ||align=center|6 ||The red card awarded to James Jennings for a deliberate handball in the 1–0 defeat at Mansfield Townon 28 August 2010 was subsequently rescinded by the FA, and is therefore not included in this total. 
|-
|Worst discipline ||align=center|James Jennings|| 2 red card, 8 yellow cards
|-
|Best result ||align=center|5–0 || v. Gateshead, 4 September 2010
|-
|Worst result ||align=center|1–5  0–4|| v. Mansfield Town, 23 December 2010v.  Bath City, 29 January 2011
|-
|Most appearances ||align=center|47 || Wright
|-
|Top scorer ||align=center|10 || Willmott, Wright
|-
|Points ||align=center|50 || Out of a possible 138 (36%)
|-

Match results

Pre-season

A.  The club competed in some friendlies as a Cambridge United XI, rather than a full first team. Where indicated, a Cambridge United XI team played which featured more a mixture of squad players and trialists than in other games.

League

Results by round

Matches

FA Cup

FA Trophy

Transfers

In

Out

Backroom staff

References

See also 
2010–11 in English football
2010–11 Football Conference

Cambridge United F.C. seasons
Cambridge United